A supertall building refers to height of 300 to 599m. A form of skyscraper, it falls midway between a common minimum definition of "skyscraper" height of 150m and a "megatall" building reaches 600m.

Different organizations from the United States and Europe define skyscrapers generally as buildings at least 150 metres in height or taller.

List of supertall buildings

See also 
List of architects of supertall buildings
List of tallest buildings in the world

References

 
Structural engineering
Structural system
Building types